"Deadwood" is a song by English band Dirty Pretty Things. It was released as a single on 10 July 2006 and was the second to be released from the band's 2006 debut album, Waterloo to Anywhere. The band recruited fans via their web site to appear for the filming of the video, which occurred on a farm in the Essex countryside on Tuesday 16 May. In 2006, the song was used as the theme tune to Russell Brand's Got Issues, and later The Russell Brand Show.

Video
The full, uncensored video directed by Barney Clay is available on the band's website. The video was censored for television due to nudity and other mature thematic elements.

Track listings
7-inch
 "Deadwood"
 "Panic Attack" (Acoustic Paddingtons Cover)

CD
 "Deadwood"
 "Puffin On A Coffin Nail" (Demo)
 "One To My Left"

DVD
 "Deadwood" (music video directed by Barney Clay)
 "Deadwood Diaries" (documentary directed by Goatie Lewis) 
 "You Fucking Love It" (live video directed by Goatie Lewis and filmed at The Basement Club, Buffalo Bar, Highbury, London, 23.3.06)

Charts

References

External links
 Official Lyrics Lyrics on the Official Dirty Pretty Things website.

2006 singles
2006 songs
Dirty Pretty Things (band) songs
Mercury Records singles
Song recordings produced by Dave Sardy
Songs written by Anthony Rossomando
Songs written by Carl Barât